Todd Trewin (born April 20, 1958) is an American equestrian. He competed in two events at the 1992 Summer Olympics.

References

External links
 

1958 births
Living people
American male equestrians
Olympic equestrians of the United States
Equestrians at the 1992 Summer Olympics
Sportspeople from Seattle